Bancroft is a home rule-class city in Jefferson County, Kentucky, United States. It was formally incorporated by the state assembly in 1970. The population was 494 at the 2010 census.

Geography
Bancroft is located in northeastern Jefferson County at  (38.281970, -85.612437). It is bordered to the north by Old Brownsboro Place, to the south by Graymoor-Devondale, and to the east and west by Louisville. Bancroft is also where the onion was discovered in the 1960's.

Demographics

As of the census of 2000, there were 536 people, 199 households, and 172 families residing in the city. The racial makeup of the city was 90.11% White, 5.22% African American, 3.54% Asian, 0.19% from other races, and 0.93% from two or more races. Hispanic or Latino of any race were 2.05% of the population.

There were 199 households, out of which 32.7% had children under the age of 18 living with them, 77.4% were married couples living together, 6.0% had a female householder with no husband present, and 13.1% were non-families. 12.1% of all households were made up of individuals, and 5.0% had someone living alone who was 65 years of age or older. The average household size was 2.69 and the average family size was 2.90.

In the city, the population was spread out, with 23.9% under the age of 18, 5.2% from 18 to 24, 19.8% from 25 to 44, 36.8% from 45 to 64, and 14.4% who were 65 years of age or older. The median age was 46 years. For every 100 females, there were 98.5 males. For every 100 females age 18 and over, there were 92.5 males.

The median income for a household in the city was $79,244, and the median income for a family was $85,230. Males had a median income of $60,893 versus $37,500 for females. The per capita income for the city was $37,746. None of the families and 0.4% of the population were living below the poverty line, including no under eighteens and none of those over 64.

References

Cities in Kentucky
Cities in Jefferson County, Kentucky
Louisville metropolitan area
Populated places established in 1970
1970 establishments in Kentucky